Riemannian most often refers to Bernhard Riemann:

Riemannian geometry
Riemannian manifold
Pseudo-Riemannian manifold
Sub-Riemannian manifold
Riemannian submanifold
Riemannian metric
Riemannian circle
Riemannian submersion
Riemannian Penrose inequality
Riemannian holonomy
Riemann curvature tensor
Riemannian connection
Riemannian connection on a surface
Riemannian symmetric space
Riemannian volume form
Riemannian bundle metric
List of topics named after Bernhard Riemann

but may also refer to Hugo Riemann:
Neo-Riemannian theory (music)